Derek Leslie Underwood  (born 8 June 1945) is an English former international cricketer, and a former President of the Marylebone Cricket Club (MCC).

Through much of his career, Underwood was regarded as one of the best bowlers in Test cricket. Although classified as a slow left-arm orthodox spin bowler, Underwood bowled at around medium pace and was often unplayable on seaming English wickets, particularly sticky wickets, earning his nickname 'Deadly', and accounting for the saying that England would "carry Underwood like an umbrella, in case of rain". Underwood was noted for his consistent accuracy, and his inswinging arm ball was particularly noted for dismissing batsmen leg before wicket. Keith Dunstan wrote that he was "inclined to wear a hole in the pitch by dropping the ball on the same spot...".

Underwood was a first-class bowler from his teens, and he took his 100th Test wicket and 1,000th first-class wicket in 1971, aged only 25. Only George Lohmann and Wilfred Rhodes had secured a thousand wickets at an earlier age than Underwood. He used to say that bowling was a 'low mentality profession: plug away, line and length, until there's a mistake', and sooner or later every batsman would make a mistake. He would finish his Test career with 297 wickets, and had it not been for his involvement in World Series Cricket and the rebel tour to South Africa, there is little doubt he would have had more than 300 Test wickets.

On 16 July 2009, Underwood was inducted into the ICC Cricket Hall of Fame, along with others including Neil Harvey, David Gower and Allan Border.

Early life and county career
Underwood was born in Bromley Maternity Hospital, the second son of Leslie Frank Underwood and Evelyn Annie Wells. His early days were spent watching his father, a right-arm medium pace bowler, play for Farnborough Cricket Club, where older brother Keith also played. Underwood was educated at Beckenham and Penge Grammar School for Boys and in 1961 he took all ten wickets for the school's First XI, of which his brother was the captain, against Bromley Grammar School.

Underwood played county cricket for Kent, making his first-class debut against Yorkshire aged 17 in 1963. He became the youngest player to take 100 County Championship wickets in a debut season. He went on to take 100 wickets in a season a further nine times. His batting was less accomplished, averaging barely over ten runs per innings in 676 matches.

Test career
Underwood took the last four Australian wickets in 27 balls in the final half an hour at the end of the fifth Test in 1968, after a heavy thunderstorm on the fifth day had all but ended the match, to square an Ashes series that Australia were winning 1–0. He was named in 1969 as one of the Wisden Cricketers of the Year. Underwood also toured Australia in 1970–71, dismissing Terry Jenner to win the seventh Test at Sydney, and regain the Ashes.

According to the retrospective ICC Test bowler rankings, Underwood was ranked number 1 in the world from September 1969 to August 1973. He reached a peak rating of 907 after his 12-wicket haul against New Zealand in the 1971 series.

World Series Cricket and rebel South African tour
Underwood was one of six England cricketers (the others being John Snow, Alan Knott, Dennis Amiss, Bob Woolmer and Tony Greig), to feature in Kerry Packer's World Series Cricket in the late 1970s.

He also went on the rebel tour South Africa in 1981–82, bringing his England career to an end as it was in defiance of the sporting ban against the apartheid state. For this he and the other rebels were banned from international cricket for three years.

Later career
Underwood was almost unplayable on damp wickets, but on dry tracks he would often push the ball through a little quicker and flatter, not wanting to risk being hit over his head, which he always hated. Oddly, he rarely completed a whole Test series for England, as a succession of England captains would switch to bigger turners of the ball, such as Norman Gifford.

He scored his first and only first-class century (111) at the age of 39, in his 591st first-class match in July 1984. It was played at Hastings, a favourite bowling haunt for Underwood who, having gone in to bat as nightwatchman, finally reached the hundred mark in his 618th first-class innings.  The cricket writer Colin Bateman noted, "there was no more popular century that summer".

Underwood retired from cricket in 1987, at the age of 42, having taken 2,465 wickets at a little over 20 apiece.

Recognition
Underwood was appointed an MBE in the 1981 New Year Honours for his services to cricket.

In 1997, he became patron of the Primary Club, and in 2008 it was announced that he would serve as President of MCC for the following year.

In a Wisden article in 2004, he was selected as a member of England's greatest post-war XI.

Underwood was appointed an Honorary Fellow of Canterbury Christ Church University at a ceremony held at Canterbury Cathedral on 30 January 2009.

Personal life
Underwood married wife Dawn in October 1973 and has two daughters.
 
He became a consultant for ClubTurf Cricket Limited, joining his brother Keith who had become managing director.

See also
List of international cricket five-wicket hauls by Derek Underwood

References

Further reading

External links
 
Sunday Times article 31 May, 2009

England One Day International cricketers
England Test cricketers
English cricketers of 1969 to 2000
English cricketers
Kent cricketers
Wisden Cricketers of the Year
World Series Cricket players
International Cavaliers cricketers
Cricketers at the 1975 Cricket World Cup
People from Bromley
1945 births
Living people
People educated at Beckenham and Penge County Grammar School
Presidents of the Marylebone Cricket Club
Marylebone Cricket Club cricketers
Presidents of Kent County Cricket Club
D. H. Robins' XI cricketers
T. N. Pearce's XI cricketers
Marylebone Cricket Club Under-25s cricketers
Marylebone Cricket Club President's XI cricketers